Appie Corman (30 November 1925 – 24 April 2006) was a Dutch boxer. He competed in the men's flyweight event at the 1948 Summer Olympics.

References

1925 births
2006 deaths
Dutch male boxers
Olympic boxers of the Netherlands
Boxers at the 1948 Summer Olympics
Sportspeople from Groningen (city)
Flyweight boxers